Bhagalpur Junction railway station (station code: BGP), is an A-1 category railway station serving the city of Bhagalpur in the Bhagalpur district of Indian state of Bihar. It comes under jurisdiction of Malda Railway Division of Eastern Railway Zone of Indian Railways.
Bhagalpur Railway Station is among the 148 important stations that have been selected for redevelopment with world-class infrastructure having an airport like look.
Malda Division has approved its master plan for redevelopment at a cost of 481.60 crores.
A new terminal will also be built next to this station and its DPR has been sent to the ministry for approval.
Trains such as Vikramshila Express, Bhagalpur-Danapur Intercity Express, Anga Express, etc originate from this station.

History 

Bhagalpur Junction railway station is connected to most of the major cities in India by the railway network. It lies in the Sahibganj loop which serves Bhagalpur with numerous trains. It is the third busiest line in Bihar. About 100 pairs of Express and 44 pairs of Passenger trains pass through this line. Bhagalpur Junction is an  A1 grade railway station.

It is the highest revenue generator in the Malda railway division. It is the third major railway station in Eastern Railway after Howrah and Sealdah.

Railway transportation was introduced in India within 30 years of its maiden run in England.

The East Indian Railway Company, formed on 1 June 1845, completed its survey for a railway line from Kolkata, then called Calcutta, to Delhi via Mirzapur in 1846. The company initially became defunct on refusal of government guarantee, which was given in 1849. Thereafter, an agreement was signed between East Indian Railway Company and the East India Company, for the construction and operation of an "experimental" line between Kolkata and Rajmahal, which would later be extended to Delhi via Mirzapur. Construction began in 1851.

On 1 February 1855 the first train ran from Hooghly to Raniganj,  from Howrah. The priority accorded to the Raniganj section was because of the assurance of coal transportation.

The Khana Junction-Rajmahal section was complete in October 1859, crossing Ajay River on the way. The first train ran from Howrah to Rajmahal via Khana on 4 July 1860. The loop from Khana Junction to Kiul via Jamalpur, including the Monghyr branch, was ready in February 1862.

From Rajmahal, construction progressed rapidly, moving westward along the banks of the Ganges, reaching Bhagalpur in 1861, Munger in February 1862, and opposite Varanasi (across the Ganges) in December 1862 and then on to Naini on the bank of the Yamuna. The work included EIR's first tunnel at Jamalpur and first major bridge across the Son River at Arrah.

During 1863–64, work progressed rapidly on the Allahabad–Kanpur–Tundla and Aligarh–Ghaziabad sections. The Yamuna bridge near Delhi was completed in 1864 and EIR established the Delhi terminus. The Yamuna bridge at Allahabad opened on 15 August 1865 and in 1866 Kolkata and Delhi were directly linked. The 1 Dn/ 2 Up Mail started running.

With the completion of the -long line connecting Raniganj with Kiul in 1871, a "shorter main line" was in position. Initially, it was called the chord line. However, as it attracted more traffic it was designated the main line and the original line became the Sahibganj loop.

After approximately 150 years of operation, Kiul Jn. to Barharwa Jn. section including Bhagalpur Jn. of Sahibganj loop line is converted in double line on 14-05-2019 except Ratanpur–Jamalpur section.

Bhagalpur is also the originating station for many Superfast and Express trains.

Facilities
The major facilities available include free wi-fi across the entire Bhagalpur Junction platforms, waiting rooms, retiring room, a computerised reservation facility, reservation counter, vehicle parking etc. The vehicles are allowed to enter the station premises. There are refreshment rooms vegetarian and non-vegetarian, tea stall, book stall, post and telegraphic office and Government Railway police (G.R.P.) office. Automatic ticket vending machines have been installed to reduce the queue on the station for train tickets.

Platforms
There are six standard on-ground platforms at the station and seven railway lines passing through it. All platforms are well interlinked with three footover bridges and has elevators installed. The station has entry and exit at platform number 1 and platform number 6.

Escalators
Bhagalpur Junction is among the selected railway stations of India where automated Escalators are installed.

Developments
In the Rail Budget 2008, Bhagalpur was announced to be converted to as Railway Division and yet to be implemented by ER.
The new rail lines from Sultanganj to Deoghar were announced and the construction is yet to start.

Approximately after 157 years, the Kiul-Bhagalpur rail section has a second tunnel become operational on 29-01-2022. (Only Ratanpur to Jamalpur section of the Kiul Jn. to Barharwa section was operating on singletrack as Work on the construction of the second tunnel near Jamalpur was in progress. Work for doubling the 111-kilometer-long (69  mi) stretch started in 2010 (announced in 1996).)

Work on the new 130-kilometer (81  mi) long Rampurhat–Dumka–Mander Hill broad-gauge line completed and Kavi Guru Express Bhagalpur Jn to Howrah is running on this route.

The construction of Pirpainti–Godda–Hansdiha new rail line is under progress and Hansdiha–Padeyahat (हंसडीहा-ैड़ेयाहाट) section is opened on 17 September 2019.
Godda–Hansdiha Section of Pirpainti–Godda–Hansdiha new rail line is opened on 04 April 2021.

The Electrification of Jamalpur Locomotive Workshop (established on 8 February 1862 as the first full-fledged railway workshop facility in India) is started. Maintenance and repairing of Electric Locomotive are also started.

Electrification Updats 
The Howrah–Gaya–Delhi route also known as the Grand Chord was the shortest route in India to be completely electrified (AC traction) and was electrified on August 5, 1976.

The electrification work of the rail line between Bonidanga Link Cabin to Kiul Junction via Barharwa–Sahibganj–Bhagalpur is completed in June 2020.The electrification of Bonidanga Link Cabin–Barharwa–Sahibganj–Kiul section including the Tinpahar–Rajmahal section (announced by Pt. Deen Dayal Upadhyaya package in Bihar).

After approximately 155 years of rail operation on Kiul Jn. to Bhagalpur Jn. section of the Sahibganj loop rail line, Vikramshila Express became the first train hauled by an electric locomotive on 2 June 2019. 12368 Down ANVT to BGP Vikranshila Exp. arrived at BGP hauled by an electric locomotive. The electric train started from BGP on 03 June 2019. 12367 UP BGP to ANVT Vikramshila Express departed from BGP hauled by an electric locomotive.

Goods train started with E-loco from 3 July 2020 as the Bhagalpur–Bonidanga section is electrified. On Bhagalpur–Sahibganj section train number 05956/05955 Delhi–Dibrugarh-Delhi Special (Brahmaputra Mail) became the first train running with E-loco on 7 July 2020 up to New Jalpaiguri (NJP) via Bhagalpur.

In June 2020, with the completion of electrification of the Sahibganj loop from (Bonidanga Link Cabin to Kiul) distance of a total 247km, it became a history of 100% electrification of the oldest Howrah–New Delhi rail route constructed by the British Government (East India Company).

The Bhagalpur–Barahat–Banka section of Dumka–Bhagalpur line was completely electrified on 29 March 2021. Banka-Rajendranagar Intercity Exp. got Electric Traction from Banka on 29 March 2021 (First Train Godda-New Delhi Humsafar special (02307) flagged off). The remaining electrification work from the Barahat-Dumka-Rampurhat section was also completely electrified on 6th October 2021.
The operation of an electric locomotive on the Mandarhil-Dumka rail section has started on 06 January 2022. Kaviguru Express is the first electric train on this route.

Jamalpur Workshop
Jamalpur Workshop on Kiul Jn.–Bhagalpur Jn. section, the first full-fledged railway workshop facility in India, was opened on 8 February 1862, at a time when the Howrah–Delhi main line, passing through Jamalpur was under construction. It undertook repairs of wagons, coaches, cranes and tower cars, and locomotives, as well as manufacture of some tower cars, break-down cranes and various kinds of heavy-duty lifting jacks.
They also produced their own locomotives, starting with the CA 764 Lady Curzon in 1899. It has also produced ticket printers and other ticket machines (slitting, counting, and chopping). With fairly extensive workshop facilities, it was a fairly self-contained.[7]

Branch lines
Bhagalpur–Rampurhat via Dumka
Bhagalpur–Jasidih via Banka
Bhagalpur–Godda via Hansdiha

See also

 Bhagalpur
 Sultanganj railway station
 Jamalpur Junction railway station
 Banka Junction railway station
 Dumka railway station
 Mandar Hill railway station

References

Railway junction stations in Bihar
Railway stations in Bhagalpur district
Malda railway division
Transport in Bhagalpur
Buildings and structures in Bhagalpur